The Thomas W. Eadie Medal is an award of the Royal Society of Canada "for contributions in engineering and applied science". It is named in honour of Thomas Wardrope Eadie and is awarded annually. The award consists of a bronze medal and Can$3,000 of cash. The award appears to have been discontinued.

Recipients
The following people received the Thomas W. Eadie Medal:

See also

 List of engineering awards

References 

Canadian science and technology awards
Royal Society of Canada